Kristin Commands (Swedish: Kristin kommenderar) is a 1946 Swedish comedy film directed by Gustaf Edgren and starring Dagmar Ebbesen, Wanda Rothgardt and Gunnar Björnstrand.

The film's sets were designed by the art director Nils Svenwall.

Cast
 Dagmar Ebbesen as Kristin Carlsson  
 Wanda Rothgardt as Marianne Westman  
 Gunnar Björnstrand as Dr. Westman Senior / Vilhelm Westman  
 John Elfström as Herman Karlsson  
 Olle Florin as Olle Elwing 
 Gabriel Alw as Professor 
 Margit Andelius as Janitor's Wife 
 Ann-Charlotte Bergman as Maj Westman  
 Margaretha Bergström as Nurse  
 Signhild Björkman as Office Clerk  
 Tor Borong as The Crook  
 Erland Colliander as Farmer  
 Nils Dahlgren as Pawn Broker  
 Carl Deurell as Promotor 
 Sture Djerf as Police Officer 
 Åke Engfeldt as Runqvist  
 Ulf Eriksson as Go-Between  
 Vera Fränkel as Nurse  
 Hugo Hasslo as Farmer  
 Sten Hedlund as Doctor  
 Olle Hilding as Man at Auction  
 Gösta Holmström as Student  
 Svea Holst as Old Woman in Staircase  
 Nils Jacobsson as Djurgårds-Kalle  
 Margit Jonje as Woman from Småland  
 Helge Karlsson as Auctionist  
 Magnus Kesster as Man at Hospital  
 Ivar Kåge as Professor  
 Arne Lindblad as Janitor Hansson  
 Ulla Malmström as Girl from Dalarna  
 Börje Mellvig as Torre  
 Gull Natorp as Hanna - Deaf Lady 
 Nils Nordståhl as Editor  
 Marianne Orlando as Kristin as Child  
 Per Oscarsson as Jan Westman  
 Willy Peters as Young Man 
 Margit Pettersson as Sonja Westman  
 Kristina Ranå as Girl from Kristinehamn  
 Olav Riégo as Professor  
 Sif Ruud as Applicant for Position  
 Hanny Schedin as Kristin's mother  
 Tord Stål as Opponent 
 Bojan Westin as Ella  
 Carla Wiberg as Emma  
 Signe Wirff as Patient 
 Inga-Lill Åhström as Patient 
 Brita Öberg as Cleaning Lady

References

Bibliography 
 Per Olov Qvist & Peter von Bagh. Guide to the Cinema of Sweden and Finland. Greenwood Publishing Group, 2000.

External links 
 

1946 films
1946 comedy films
Swedish comedy films
1940s Swedish-language films
Films directed by Gustaf Edgren
Swedish black-and-white films
1940s Swedish films